The following is a list of unproduced Phil Lord and Christopher Miller projects in roughly chronological order. During their career, film-making duo Phil Lord and Christopher Miller have worked on a number of projects which never progressed beyond the pre-production stage under their direction. Some of these projects are officially cancelled or fell in development hell.

2010s

Bob The Musical
By December 2010, Phil Lord and Christopher Miller were in talks to replace Adam Shankman and Mark Waters as directors of the movie musical comedy Bob the Musical for Walt Disney Pictures and Benderspink’s Chris Bender and the late J.C. Spink and Contrafilm’s Beau Flynn and Tripp Vinson attached to produce the movie. In December 2011, Lord and Miller were officially attached to direct the movie from a screenplay from Matthew Fogel, Marc Shaiman would work on the music, Robert Lopez would write the songs. In July 2015, Lord and Miller were replaced by Michel Hazanavicius as director, Michael Chabon writing the script, Bret McKenzie would write the songs, Tom Cruise was in talks to star in the movie, and Bender, Spink, Flynn  and Vinson still attached as producers.

Untitled Ghostbusters film
In April 2014, Sony pursued a short list of potential directors for Ghostbusters 3, including Phil Lord and Chris Miller, but they passed on the project.

The Greatest American Hero reboot
In August 2014, Lord and Miller were attached to reboot the 1981 TV series The Greatest American Hero for Fox. They were to executive produce the series, with 22 Jump Street co-writer Rodney Rothman writing the pilot and also executive producing. By 2017, Lord, Miller, and Rothman were out as 20th Century Fox Television were interested in developing a female-led reboot from Fresh Off the Boat creator Nahnatchka Khan and would instead air on ABC. However, ABC decided to not pick up the show in 2018.

23 Jump Street/MIB 23
On September 10, 2014, 23 Jump Street was confirmed. Channing Tatum had yet to sign on to the project, stating, "I don't know if that joke works three times, so we'll see." On August 7, 2015, it was revealed that Lord and Miller would not direct the film, but instead write and produce. A first draft of the film's script has been completed. On December 10, 2014, it was revealed that Sony was planning a crossover between Men in Black and Jump Street. The news was leaked after Sony's system was hacked and then confirmed by the directors of the films, Lord and Miller, during an interview about it. James Bobin was announced as the director in March 2016. The title of the crossover was later revealed as MIB 23, and it was revealed that the crossover would replace a 23 Jump Street film. However, the project was canceled in January 2019. Shortly after, Phil Lord stated that, despite MIB 23 not happening, a third sequel entitled 24 Jump Street was in development.

Female-driven 21 Jump Street
In early 2015, a female-driven 21 Jump Street film was rumored to also be in the works. In December 2016, Rodney Rothman was confirmed to direct the film. In December 2018, Tiffany Haddish was confirmed to lead the film and Awkwafina is in talks.

The Flash
By April 2015, Phil Lord and Christopher Miller were writing a story treatment for The Flash film for the DC Extended Universe. In October 2015, Seth Grahame-Smith was in negotiations to direct and write the script, based on the treatment by Lord and Miller. He departed the project due to creative differences in April 2016.

Solo: A Star Wars Story

In January 2017, Lord and Miller began directing a then-untitled film, a standalone Star Wars movie based on the Han Solo character. On June 20, 2017, it was reported that they had been fired from the project by Lucasfilm, after over four-and-a-half months of filming, about three-quarters through principal photography. Lucasfilm announced that "creative differences" were the reason, with Entertainment Weekly reporting that Lord and Miller were going off-script and trying to make the film into more of a comedy. They were unwilling to compromise with Lucasfilm and writer Lawrence Kasdan on the direction of the film, preferring their vision. Two days later, Ron Howard was announced as the replacement, to complete the film and reshoots. Lord and Miller received executive-producer credits on Solo: A Star Wars Story.

In November 2017, Lord and Miller commented on their departure from Solo: A Star Wars Story. Lord stated "The experience of shooting the movie was wonderful. We had the most incredible cast and crew and collaborators. [...] We're really proud of the work we did on the movie and we wish everybody the best." Miller added "As Phil said, we had such a great relationship with cast and crew, we were really rooting for them. After we took a much-needed vacation, we got back into it and now we're writing and producing a sequel to The Lego Movie and producing a Miles Morales animated Spider-Man."

References

External links
 The Five Best Films Phil Lord and Chris Miller Never Made by Film School Rejects

Lord, Phil
Miller, Christopher